Niujiaodian is a town in Dong'e County, Liaocheng, in western Shandong province, China.

References

Township-level divisions of Shandong
Dong'e County